Sharif Mohamed (born 9 May 1995) is a Maldivian politician and entrepreneur who served as a Media Coordinator at The President's Office of the Maldives in 2015. Prior to his appointment on 7 July 2015, he served in executive committees of non-governmental organizations and as a youth wing council member of the Jumhooree Party (Republican Party).

Early life and education
Sharif Mohamed was born in Thiruvananthapuram, India and raised in Male' City, Maldives. He attended Dharumavantha School for his secondary education before receiving his degree from the University of the West of England in 2018 and a postgraduate diploma from the National University of Singapore in 2019.

Career
Sharif began his career in 2012 at The Space Pvt Ltd as an administrative and marketing officer. During the continuation of his studies, he had worked on and off at certain different organizations and institutions. After graduating in 2018, he started work as the Corporate Affairs Manager and as a Non-Executive Director to the Board at South Palm Maldives Pvt Ltd.

Sharif stepped into the national spotlight in 2012 as a young academic individual expressing the emerging concerns on the political turmoil of the nation and how badly it was affecting the nation.

On 10 July 2015, he became the third Media Coordinator at the President's of the Maldives under the administration of President Abdulla Yameen.

On 19 August 2015, it was announced that Sharif had been sacked from his post after making statements vowing to confront the Vice President Ahmed Adeeb in defense of President Abdulla Yameen. The leaked audio clip unleashed the uncertainty within the government and deteriorating relations between President Yameen and Vice President Adeeb. Sharif mentioned in the audio clip “I will confront anyone who criticizes President Yameen, you cannot tell me who I should confront. I have no problem confronting even the Vice President for President Yameen,” Sharif is heard saying in an audio clip posted by the opposition-aligned Raajje TV.

Political career
After the controversial resignation of President Mohamed Nasheed on 7 February 2012, Sharif entered the political arena as a young individual rising voice and in the allegiance of President Mohamed Nasheed who was actively part of the protests. After Abdulla Yameen was sworn in as President of Maldives, on 17 November 2013, Sharif Mohamed was appointed as Media Coordinator at the President's Office on 10 July 2015.

On 24 October 2016, Sharif urged President Maumoon Abdul Gayoom to hand over PPM to President Yameen in support to the court ruling to hand over Progress Party of Maldives leadership to his half-brother and Maldivian President Abdulla Yameen Abdul Gayoom. Sharif also highlighted the importance of the subsidy implementation of food staple and how it will benefit for the people in the statement.

Contributions 
During his brief period at the president's office, Sharif drafted Government Offices, Ministries and State Owned Enterprises Media Coordinators framework and guidelines. He also assisted in providing public opinion on social housing and drafted Maldives National Youth Forum's framework and guidelines.

References

External links 
Official Website

1995 births
Living people
Maldivian politicians
Maldivian Muslims
Progressive Party of Maldives politicians
People from Addu City
Jumhooree Party politicians
Maldivian Democratic Party politicians